Blasdell is a village in Erie County, New York, United States. The population was 2,553 according to the 2010 Census. The name is derived from Herman Blasdell, the first station master of the Erie and Pennsylvania railroad depot. It is part of the Buffalo–Niagara Falls Metropolitan Statistical Area.

Blasdell is in the northern part of the town of Hamburg and is bordered to the north by the city of Lackawanna, directly south of Buffalo. The village calls itself the "Gateway to the Southtowns" of Erie County.

History 
The community grew as a railroad town around the Erie Railroad. Blasdell was incorporated in 1898 as a village.

Wrestler Ilio DiPaolo was a longtime resident, before his death in 1995. In 1965 he opened an Italian restaurant on South Park Avenue. It is now run by his family.

Blasdell is one of two municipalities in Erie County to have a registered Conservative as its executive, the other being Newstead.

Geography
Blasdell is located at  (42.795108, -78.828004).

Adjacent cities and towns
 City of Lackawanna - north
 Town of Hamburg - south, east, west

Major highways in the Village of Blasdell

   Interstate 90 (New York State Thruway), although it does not run through the village, the thruway lies just east of it and access to it is provided by Mile Strip Road/Expressway. (NY 179).
  U.S. Route 62 (South Park Avenue), north-south roadway that runs through the village from Hamburg in the south to Lackawanna in the north.
  New York State Route 179 (Mile Strip Expressway), east- west expressway that borders the south village line. Important route for traffic between NY 5, US 62, the NYS Thruway and beyond.

Demographics

As of the census of 2000, there were 2,718 people, 1,201 households, and 684 families residing in the village. The population density was 2,361.9 people per square mile (912.5/km2). There were 1,282 housing units at an average density of 1,114.1 per square mile (430.4/km2). The racial makeup of the village was 96.80% White, 0.22% African American, 0.37% Native American, 0.07% Asian, 1.51% from other races, and 1.03% from two or more races. Hispanic or Latino of any race were 3.46% of the population.

There were 1,201 households, out of which 26.3% had children under the age of 18 living with them, 39.6% were married couples living together, 12.5% had a female householder with no husband present, and 43.0% were non-families. 37.6% of all households were made up of individuals, and 15.6% had someone living alone who was 65 years of age or older. The average household size was 2.26 and the average family size was 3.04.

In the village, the population was spread out, with 24.6% under the age of 18, 6.7% from 18 to 24, 31.5% from 25 to 44, 20.0% from 45 to 64, and 17.2% who were 65 years of age or older. The median age was 36 years. For every 100 females, there were 89.5 males. For every 100 females age 18 and over, there were 87.0 males.

The median income for a household in the village was $35,613, and the median income for a family was $43,846. Males had a median income of $37,500 versus $22,917 for females. The per capita income for the village was $17,925. About 6.7% of families and 6.4% of the population were below the poverty line, including 5.0% of those under age 18 and 6.4% of those age 65 or over.

Notable person
 Ilio DiPaolo, professional wrestler

References

External links
 Village of Blasdell official website

Villages in New York (state)
Buffalo–Niagara Falls metropolitan area
Villages in Erie County, New York